Udayam may refer to:

Udayam (1973 film), a Malayalam film starring Madhu and Sharada
Udayam (TV series), a Singaporean reality television series